Chris Randle (born June 18, 1988) is an American professional Canadian football defensive back who is currently a free agent. He played college football at Utah State. He has also been a member of the Calgary Stampeders, Winnipeg Blue Bombers, and Ottawa Redblacks in the Canadian Football League (CFL) and the Dallas Cowboys in the National Football League (NFL).

Professional career

Dallas Cowboys
After going undrafted in the 2011 NFL Draft Randle signed with the Dallas Cowboys in July 2011.

Calgary Stampeders
Randle signed with the Calgary Stampeders on May 22, 2012. Randle played two seasons in Calgary, contributing 34 defensive tackles and eight special teams tackles in both seasons: He also recorded five interceptions.

Winnipeg Blue Bombers
On February 10, 2014, Randle was traded to the Winnipeg Blue Bombers. In his first four seasons in Winnipeg Randle became an increasingly fundamental part of the defense; culminating in being named a CFL All-Star in 2017. In January 2018 Randle and the Bombers agreed to a two-year contract extension; preventing him from becoming a free agent in February 2018. He was released by the Bombers on January 9, 2019.

Ottawa Redblacks 
On January 25, 2019 Randle and the Ottawa Redblacks agreed to a one-year contract.

Statistics

References

External links
 Utah State bio 
 Winnipeg Blue Bombers bio
 

1988 births
Living people
American football defensive backs
American players of Canadian football
Calgary Stampeders players
Canadian football defensive backs
People from Merced, California
Players of American football from Berkeley, California
Utah State Aggies football players
Winnipeg Blue Bombers players
Ottawa Redblacks players